Hugo Ventura Ferreira Moura Guedes (born 14 January 1988), known as Ventura, is a Portuguese former professional footballer who played as a goalkeeper.

Club career
Born in Vila Nova de Gaia, Porto District, Ventura joined FC Porto's youth system at the age of 10. He only appeared in two Primeira Liga games during his tenure with the club, his debut occurring on 10 May 2008 in a 2–0 away win against Associação Naval 1º de Maio. Until the end of his contract, he was successively loaned to S.C. Olhanense (twice), Portimonense S.C. and Sporting CP; with Porto, he was also included in the main squad on 18 September 2007 in a 1–1 at home against Liverpool in the group stage of the UEFA Champions League and on 21 October of the following year for a 0–1 home defeat to FC Dynamo Kyiv in the same competition.

Late into the 2014 January transfer window, Ventura signed with Rio Ave F.C. also in the top division. In the summer he joined C.F. Os Belenenses of the same league, where he eventually beat competition from Englishman Matt Jones.

International career
Ventura earned 37 caps for Portugal at youth level, including 13 for the under-21s. On 3 February 2011 he was called up for the first time to the full side by coach Paulo Bento for a friendly with Argentina in Geneva, Switzerland, receiving his second selection in March 2015 after being summoned by Fernando Santos ahead of a UEFA Euro 2016 qualifier against Serbia and being retained as an unused substitute later that month in a 0–2 defeat to Cape Verde in Estoril.

Club statistics

Honours
Porto
Primeira Liga: 2007–08, 2008–09
Taça de Portugal: 2008–09

References

External links

1988 births
Living people
Sportspeople from Vila Nova de Gaia
Portuguese footballers
Association football goalkeepers
Primeira Liga players
Liga Portugal 2 players
FC Porto players
S.C. Olhanense players
Portimonense S.C. players
Sporting CP footballers
Sporting CP B players
Rio Ave F.C. players
C.F. Os Belenenses players
Portugal youth international footballers
Portugal under-21 international footballers